Walter B. Smith (born 1827, date of death unknown) was a Union Navy sailor in the American Civil War and a recipient of the U.S. military's highest decoration, the Medal of Honor, for his actions at the Battle of Mobile Bay.

Born in 1827, in New York, Smith joined the Navy from that state. During the Battle of Mobile Bay on August 5, 1864, he manned an artillery gun on the topgallant forecastle (a deck at the top of the ship's forecastle). For these actions, he was awarded the Medal of Honor four months later, on December 31, 1864.

Smith's official Medal of Honor citation reads:
On board the U.S.S. Richmond during action against rebel forts and gunboats and with the ram Tennessee in Mobile Bay, 5 August 1864. Cool and courageous at his station throughout the prolonged action, Smith rendered outstanding service at the 100-pounder rifle on the topgallant forecastle and while firing his musket into the gun ports of the rebel Tennessee.

References 

1827 births
Year of death missing
People of New York (state) in the American Civil War
Union Navy sailors
United States Navy Medal of Honor recipients
American Civil War recipients of the Medal of Honor
Military personnel from New York City